White Rock (formerly Whiterock) is an unincorporated community in White Rock Township, Franklin County, Arkansas, United States.

References

Unincorporated communities in Franklin County, Arkansas
Unincorporated communities in Arkansas